Events from the year 1671 in art.

Events
The Discalced Carmelites of Vilnius build a wooden chapel to house the painting Our Lady of the Gate of Dawn.

Works

Philippe de Champaigne – Still Life with a Skull (approximate date)
Manuel do Coyto – Christ of Buenos Aires (sculpture in Buenos Aires Metropolitan Cathedral)
Gerard de Lairesse – Three ceiling paintings for Andries de Graeff, now at the Peace Palace in The Hague
Gillis van Tilborgh – The Tichborne Dole

Births
January 14 – Andrea Procaccini, Italian painter for the royal family of King Philip V of Spain (died 1734)
March 15 – Thomas Restout, French painter (died 1754)
July 21 – Hendrick Krock, Danish history painter (died 1738)
December 13 – Francescantonio Coratoli, Italian painter of frescoes (died 1722)
date unknown
Paolo Alboni, Italian painter (died 1734)
Giovan Battista Caniana, Italian sculptor and architect (died 1754)
Donato Creti, Italian painter of the Rococo period, active mostly in Bologna (died 1749)
Nishikawa Sukenobu, Japanese ukiyo-e printmaker from Kyoto (died 1750)
Jaime Mosen Ponz, Spanish painter (died 1730)
Michele Rocca, Italian painter, born at Parma and practised in Rome (died 1751)

Deaths
February 11 - Nicolas Pitau, Flemish engraver and printmaker (born 1632)
May 8 – Sébastien Bourdon, painter and engraver (born 1616)
May 16 – Dirck van Delen, Dutch Baroque Era painter (born 1605)
July – Adriaen Hanneman, Dutch painter best known for his portraits of the exiled British royal court (born 1603)
July 4 – Jan Cossiers, painter (born 1600)
November – Jan van Bijlert, Dutch painter, co-founder of the Bentvueghels (born 1597)
date unknown
Alessandro Badiale, Italian painter and engraver (born 1626)
Jan de Bisschop, lawyer, painter and engraver (born 1628)
Conrad Buno, German copperplate engraver, cartographer and publisher (born 1613)
Francisco Camilo, Spanish painter (born 1610)
Theresa Maria Coriolano, Italian engraver of the Baroque period (born 1620)
Gaspar Dias, Portuguese painter (date of birth unknown)
Willem Eversdijck, Dutch portrait painter (born 1620)
Giacomo Antonio Fancelli, sculptor (born 1619)
Sokuhi Nyoitsu, Buddhist monk of the Obaku Zen sect, poet and calligrapher (born 1616)
Andrea Suppa, Italian painter of marine landscapes (born 1628)

 
Years of the 17th century in art
1670s in art